Miss Polski 2021 was the 32nd Miss Polski pageant, held on August 15, 2021. The winner was Agata Wdowiak of Łódź. Wdowiak represented Poland in Miss Universe 2021.

Final results

Special Awards

Jury
The jury (judging panel) consisted of:
Ewa Wachowicz - Miss Polonia 1992 & World Miss University 1993
Viola Piekut
Edyta Herbuś
Viki Gabor
Elżbieta Sawerska - Miss Polski 2004
Katarzyna Krzeszowska - Miss Polski 2012
Magdalena Kasiborska - Miss Polski 2019
Anna-Maria Jaromin - Miss Polski 2020

Finalists

Notes

Withdrawals
 Kuyavia-Pomerania
 Lublin
 Masovia
 Warmia-Masuria

Returns
Last competed in 2018:
 Polish Community in the U.K.

Did not compete
 Holy Cross
 Opole
 Pomerania
 Subcarpathia
 Polish Community in Argentina
 Polish Community in Australia
 Polish Community in Belarus
 Polish Community in Brazil
 Polish Community in Canada
 Polish Community in Czechia
 Polish Community in France
 Polish Community in Germany
 Polish Community in Ireland
 Polish Community in Israel
 Polish Community in Kazakhstan
 Polish Community in Lithuania
 Polish Community in Russia
 Polish Community in Slovakia
 Polish Community in South Africa
 Polish Community in Sweden
 Polish Community in Ukraine
 Polish Community in the U.S.
 Polish Community in Venezuela

References

External links
Official Website

2021
2021 beauty pageants
2021 in Poland